Preslava Koleva Ivanova (born Petya Koleva Ivanova, on 26 June 1984), better known mononymously as Preslava, is a Bulgarian singer. She was born in Dobrich, Bulgaria. She is considered one of the key names in the Bulgarian modern music, and has won more than 60 awards since her debut in 2004.

Life and career

Early life (1984–2003)
Petya Koleva Ivanova was born on June 26, 1984 in Dobrich, Bulgaria . Her mother, Yanka Toncheva was a seamstress. Her father, Kolyo Tonchev was a worldwide race car driver. Ivanova has an older sister named Ivelina who is a folk singer.  She sang her first song when she was 7 years old. Despite her parents disapproval, she started singing in nightclubs at age of 15.  She completed her musical education with the specialty ‘folk singing’ with Gadulka speciality.

Career beings and Preslava (2004)
During the winter of 2004 a prominent singer from the music company Payner, Milko Kalaidjiev asked her to perform with his group for a few events. Impressed by her excessive talent, he helped her to become a part of the company. In the beginning of 2004 she released her first song, "Nezhen reket" which was a duet with Milko Kalaidjiev. In 2004, she picked a stage name –  Preslava and changed her creative direction. Instead of typical pop folk, her later songs such as "Duma za vyarnost", "Tazi nosht bezumna" and "Mili moy" were more modern sounding. They were part of her debut album, Preslava, released in December. It featured 16 songs in total. The record was received very well. It won the "Album of the Year" award in Nov Folk Magazine'''s Annual Awards of 2004. In the same ceremony, Preslava won the "Founding and Debut of the year" award. In the Annual Music Awards of Planeta TV of 2004, she won awards for "Debut of the year" and "Most prosperous performer of the year". She built the Zetiova cheshma in Mramor in 2003.

Dyavolsko Zhelanie and Intriga (2005–2006)
In the span of April to June 2005, two new singles, "Dyavolsko zhelanie" and "Zavinagi tvoya" were released. Both of them were very positively received, especially  "Dyavolsko zhelanie" which won the "Hit of the Year" award in Planeta TV's Annual Music Awards of 2005. Preslava was among the artists of Planeta TV's Summer Tour for first time in her career. In November she released her second album, Dyavolsko zhelanie. A new single with a music video, "Finalni dumi" was dropped within the same month.  In Nov Folk's Annual Awards of 2005 Preslava won the "Most Prosperous Performer" award. In April 2006 a new single, "I kogato samne" was released. It won song of the year award in the Annual Music Awards of Planeta TV of 2006 and Nov Folk Magazine's Annual Awards of 2006. Preslava was again part of the Planeta TV's Summer Tour. Within the end of year two new singles, "Zaklevam te" and "Lazha e" were released, alongside her third studio album Intriga. "Lazha e" was the first rock song she ever recorded.

 Personal life 
Since late 2017, she has been in a relationship with the Bulgarian businessman Pavel Lazarov. On September 14, 2018 she gave birth to a baby girl, Paola.

 Discography Preslava (2004)Dyavolsko Zhelanie (Дяволско желание) (2005)Intriga (Интрига) (2006)Ne Sam Angel (Не съм ангел) (2007)Pazi Se Ot Priyatelki (Пази се от приятелки) (2009)Kak Ti Stoi (Как ти стои) (2011)Da gori v lyubov'' (Да гори в любов) (2019)

Music videos

Tours
 Planeta Prima 2005 (2005)
 Planeta Prima 2006 (2006)
 Planeta Derby 2007 (2007)
 Planeta Derby Plus 2008 (2008)
 Planeta Derby 2009 (2009)
 Planeta Derby 2010 (2010)
 Preslava USA Tour (2012)
 Planeta Summer 2014 (2014)

References

External links

Preslava at Payner
Preslava at signal.bg
Preslava at Facebook
Preslava at Twitter
Preslava at YouTube
Preslava at ReverbNation

1984 births
Living people
21st-century Bulgarian women singers
Bulgarian folk-pop singers
People from Dobrich
Big Brother (Bulgarian TV series) contestants
Symphonic rock musicians
Payner artists